Apam is a coastal town and capital of Gomoa West District in the Central Region of Ghana, located approximately 45 kilometers east of the Central Region capital, Cape Coast.

Apam is the site of Fort Lijdzaamheid or Fort Patience, a Dutch-built fort which was completed in 1702, which dominates the fishing harbor and town from a rocky peninsula located on the south side of the town. It was a major port prior to independence, but after Tema was built, shipping was forbidden. The town has an Odikro (Chief of the town). It is also a major town in the Gomoa Akyempem Paramountcy. There are many fishermen as fishing is the main industry. Apam has a Secondary School, an FM station, several churches and a salt-winning industry. The Benyah Lagoon is used to produce salt.

References

External links

 Ghana-pedia webpage - Apam

Populated places in the Central Region (Ghana)